Dame Valerie Kasanita Adams  (formerly Vili; born 6 October 1984) is a retired New Zealand shot putter. She is a four-time World champion, four-time World Indoor champion, two-time Olympic, three-time Commonwealth Games champion and twice IAAF Continental Cup winner. She has a personal best throw of 21.24 metres outdoors and 20.98 m indoors. These marks are Oceanian, Commonwealth and New Zealand national records. She also holds the Oceanian junior record (18.93 m) and the Oceanian youth record (17.54 m), as well as the World Championships record, World Indoor Championships record and Commonwealth Games record.

Adams was the third woman to win world championships at the youth, junior, and senior level of an athletics event, following the feats of Yelena Isinbayeva and Jana Pittman. She was the first woman to win four consecutive individual titles at the IAAF World Championships. Adams had a winning streak that extended to 56 wins at elite-level competitions, which started in August 2010 and ended in July 2015. She was the IAAF World Athlete of the Year in 2014 and the Track & Field News Athlete of the Year in 2012 and 2013. She had the longest shot put performance of the season every year from 2006 to 2014, bar 2008 when she was second to Natallia Mikhnevich (later banned for doping that year).

Adams won silver medals at the 2012 Summer Olympics (amended to a gold after prior winner Nadzeya Astapchuk was disqualified for doping), 2016 Summer Olympics, 2005 World Championships in Athletics, and the Commonwealth Games in 2002 and 2018. She was also a bronze medallist at the 2016 IAAF World Indoor Championships. While still a teenager, Adams was a finalist at the 2003 World Championships in Athletics and the 2004 Summer Olympics.

At national level, she has won fifteen shot put titles at the New Zealand Athletics Championships between 2001 and 2018, as well as having a hammer throw national title in 2003. Adams also won four times at the Australian Athletics Championships between 2004 and 2008. From 2006 to 2012 she was chosen as the New Zealand Sportswoman of the Year seven times consecutively and has been awarded the Lonsdale Cup on five occasions in recognition as the leading national athlete in an Olympic sport.

Adams retired from athletics competition in 2022. In that year she was appointed to the board of High Performance Sport New Zealand, and was the subject of the documentary Dame Valerie Adams: More than Gold.

Career

Early career
In 1998 Adams met former javelin thrower Kirsten Hellier, who would become her coach for the next 11 years. Adams first came to prominence when winning the World Youth Championships in 2001, with a throw of 16.87 m. She followed this up in 2002 by becoming World Junior champion, throwing 17.73 m, and gained her first international senior placing with the silver medal at the Commonwealth Games, throwing 17.45 m.

She finished fifth at the 2003 World Championships at eighteen years of age. At her first Olympics in 2004, Adams finished seventh (after two athletes' subsequent disqualification), while still recovering from an appendectomy she had just weeks before the competition.

The following year Adams finished third at the World Championships with a personal best throw of 19.87 m. When the original winner, Nadzeya Astapchuk, was disqualified following a 2013 retest of her drug sample from the competition that was found to be positive, Adams' original bronze medal was upgraded to silver. Adams originally finished second at the World Athletics Final in 2005, but was promoted to gold after Astapchuk's results were annulled. At the 2006 Commonwealth Games Adams won the gold medal, breaking the 20-year-old Commonwealth Games record of 19.00 m with a throw of 19.66 m.

First world and Olympic titles
In 2007, Adams went to the Osaka World Championships as a favourite to take a medal due to her being one of only three women to throw over 20 m before the championships. In qualifying, Adams led the field with a throw of 19.45 m. Adams held second place behind Nadzeya Astapchuk throughout the final, but responded well in the last round with a mammoth throw and Commonwealth record of 20.54 m to take the gold. This made Adams one of few female athletes ever to take IAAF World Titles at youth, junior and senior level.

In 2008 Adams broke the Oceania record in winning her first World Indoor Title in Valencia (20.19 m). At the Beijing Olympics, she qualified for the final with the longest distance thrown, 19.73 meters, on her first attempt. She won the gold with a throw of 20.56 m, a personal best, beating Belarusian thrower Natallia Mikhnevich. It was the first Olympic gold medal in track and field for New Zealand since John Walker won the 1500 meter race in 1976. She also won the New Zealand Sports Award of the year in 2008.

At the 2009 Grande Prêmio Rio in Brazil Adams won the competition with a new personal best and Oceanian area record of 20.69 m. The throw was also the world leading distance for the event. In August, Adams won at the 2009 World Championships in Athletics in Berlin with a throw of 20.44 meters, ahead of the German Nadine Kleinert and Gong Lijiao of China.

At the 2010 IAAF World Indoor Championships Adams was defeated by Nadzeya Astapchuk by a large margin, in spite of the New Zealander setting a continental record of 20.49 m. Adams announced on 28 March 2010 that she would no longer be coached by Kirsten Hellier after an 11-year partnership. In April 2010 she announced her new coach was Didier Poppe.

Adams was consistently beaten by Nadzeya Astapchuk in the big meetings that season. She set a meeting record and season's best of 20.37 m at the Athletics Bridge meet in Slovakia, later saying that a change in her technique that April had begun to pay dividends.

Later that season she won at the 2010 IAAF Continental Cup with a season's best mark of 20.85 m and also competed at the Commonwealth Games in New Delhi, where she set a Games record mark of 20.47 m to retain her title. In late 2010 Jean-Pierre Egger took over as her coach from Poppe.

World and Olympic repeat
Adams won the 2011 World Championships equalling the championship record 21.24 met by Natalya Lisovskaya in 1987. At the 2012 World Indoor Championships Adams won the competition with a throw of 20.54 m, a new indoors personal best.

Adams originally won the silver medal at the 2012 London Olympics but was promoted to the gold medal after the initial Olympic champion, Nadzeya Astapchuk, failed two drug tests, one a day before the event and the second on the day of the event.

The Belarusian Ostapchuk tested positive for metenolone which is classified as an anabolic agent on the list of banned substances. Adams later recounted how she initially believed Chef de Mission Dave Currie was "telling fibs" upon being told the news. She received the gold medal from the New Zealand Governor-General, Sir Jerry Mateparae, at a special ceremony in Auckland on 19 September 2012.

Fourth world title
Adams won her fourth world championship gold at the 2013 World Championships games in Moscow in August 2013. Her fourth gold medal surpassed Astrid Kumbernuss for most all time by a female shotputter and made her the first woman to win four straight titles in an event at the competition. On 27 September, Adams underwent surgery on her left ankle and right knee, and in March 2014 won her third world indoor championship at Sopot in Poland with a distance of 20.67 m. Her gold medal at the 2014 Commonwealth Games, where she was New Zealand's flag-bearer, was her 54th consecutive event win; the streak began in August 2010.

Later career
Injury caused Adams to withdraw from an attempted defence of her shot put title at the 2014 IAAF Continental Cup and she was ruled out for most of 2015 season for the same reason. During this period she underwent surgeries on her shoulder and elbow in late 2014 and returned for a further operational on her knee in August 2015.

Adams finished second in shot put at the 2016 Summer Olympics with a distance of 20.42 m. She was beaten by Michelle Carter who had a personal best of 20.63 m with her last put of the competition.

In the 2017 New Year Honours, Adams was named a Dame Companion of the New Zealand Order of Merit. She skipped the entire track and field that season due to pregnancy.

Adams came in second in the shot put at the 2018 Commonwealth Games on the Gold Coast, Australia, with a seasonal best put of 18.70 m.

Adams announced her retirement from athletics competition on 1 March 2022, but will continue to coach Lisa Adams. In October 2022, the documentary film Dame Valerie Adams: More than Gold was released in New Zealand cinemas, depicting Adams' childhood, sporting career and the lead-up to the 2020 Summer Olympics.

Sports administration
In 2022 Adams was appointed to the board of High Performance Sport New Zealand.

Personal life

Adams was born in Rotorua, New Zealand, to a Tongan mother (Lilika Ngauamo) and an English father (Sydney Adams). Her father, who settled in New Zealand after service in the Royal Navy, had a total of 18 children with five women. Adams' youngest sibling is NBA player Steven Adams, and two other brothers played professional basketball in New Zealand. Their sister, Lisa Adams, is a paralympic champion shot-putter and discus thrower who has cerebral palsy.

Adams was married to Bertrand Vili, a discus thrower from New Caledonia. They married in 2004 and divorced in early 2010. Adams married Gabriel Price, a friend since childhood, at Temple View in Hamilton on 2 April 2016. The couple have two children: a daughter born in 2017 and a son. In 2023, Adams announced her separation from Price after nearly 7 years of marriage.

She is a member of the Church of Jesus Christ of Latter-day Saints.

Adams' training base is at the Centre national de sport de Macolin in Switzerland.

Personal bests

Seasonal bests

International competitions

 
Revised positions
2004 Olympic Games: Promoted to seventh following disqualification of winner Irina Korzhanenko and fourth-place Svetlana Krivelyova
2005 World Championships: Promoted to silver following disqualification of winner Nadzeya Astapchuk
2010 World Indoor Championships: Promoted to gold following disqualification of winner Nadzeya Astapchuk
2012 Olympic Games: Promoted to gold following disqualification of winner Nadzeya Astapchuk

National titles
New Zealand Athletics Championships
Shot put: 2001, 2002, 2003, 2004, 2005, 2006, 2007, 2008, 2009, 2010, 2011, 2013, 2014, 2016, 2018
Hammer throw: 2003
Australian Athletics Championships
Shot put: 2004, 2005, 2008, 2009

Circuit wins

IAAF Diamond League: 2010, 2011, 2012, 2013, 2014, 2016
Shanghai Golden Grand Prix: 2010
Adidas Grand Prix: 2010, 2012, 2014
British Grand Prix: 2010, 2012, 2014
Meeting Areva: 2010, 2011, 2013
Herculis: 2010, 2014, 2016
Stockholm Bauhaus Athletics: 2010, 2011, 2012, 2013
London Grand Prix: 2010, 2011, 2013
Weltklasse Zürich: 2010, 2011, 2012, 2013
Bislett Games: 2011
Athletissima: 2012, 2014, 2016
Golden Gala: 2012, 2014, 2016
Prefontaine Classic: 2013
Qatar Athletic Super Grand Prix: 2014
Memorial Van Damme: 2014
Meeting International Mohammed VI d'Athlétisme de Rabat: 2016
IAAF World Athletics Final: 2005, 2007, 2008, 2009

Awards
Laureus World Sports Award for Sportswoman of the Year: 2015 nominee
IAAF World Athlete of the Year: 2014
Track & Field News Athlete of the Year: 2012, 2013
New Zealand Listener Power List in Sport: 2008, 2009
 Member of the Order of Queen Sālote Tupou III (31 July 2008).
New Zealand Order of Merit: 2017
New Zealand's Sportswoman of the Year: 2006, 2007, 2008, 2009, 2010, 2011, 2012
Halberg Awards – Supreme Award: 2007, 2008, 2009
Lonsdale Cup of the New Zealand Olympic Committee: 2006, 2007, 2011, 2013, 2014

See also
Shot put at the Olympics
List of Olympic medalists in athletics (women)
List of 2008 Summer Olympics medal winners
List of 2012 Summer Olympics medal winners
List of 2016 Summer Olympics medal winners
List of New Zealand Olympic medallists
List of Commonwealth Games medallists in athletics (women)
List of World Championships in Athletics medalists (women)
List of Australian athletics champions (women)
List of New Zealand sportspeople
List of professional sports families
List of sporting knights and dames
Women in New Zealand

References

External links

 
 
 
 
 
 
 Vili wins the shot put title at the 2007 World Championships at YouTube
 Page with Photo, one of several at Sporting Heroes
  IAAF highlight video

1984 births
Living people
Sportspeople from Rotorua
New Zealand female shot putters
Olympic female shot putters
Olympic athletes of New Zealand
Olympic gold medalists for New Zealand
Olympic silver medalists for New Zealand
Olympic bronze medalists for New Zealand
Olympic gold medalists in athletics (track and field)
Olympic silver medalists in athletics (track and field)
Olympic bronze medalists in athletics (track and field)
Athletes (track and field) at the 2004 Summer Olympics
Athletes (track and field) at the 2008 Summer Olympics
Athletes (track and field) at the 2012 Summer Olympics
Athletes (track and field) at the 2016 Summer Olympics
Athletes (track and field) at the 2020 Summer Olympics
Medalists at the 2008 Summer Olympics
Medalists at the 2012 Summer Olympics
Medalists at the 2016 Summer Olympics
Medalists at the 2020 Summer Olympics
Commonwealth Games gold medallists for New Zealand
Commonwealth Games silver medallists for New Zealand
Commonwealth Games medallists in athletics
Athletes (track and field) at the 2002 Commonwealth Games
Athletes (track and field) at the 2006 Commonwealth Games
Athletes (track and field) at the 2010 Commonwealth Games
Athletes (track and field) at the 2014 Commonwealth Games
Athletes (track and field) at the 2018 Commonwealth Games
World Athletics Championships athletes for New Zealand
World Athletics Championships medalists
Dames Companion of the New Zealand Order of Merit
Sporting dames
New Zealand Latter Day Saints
New Zealand people of English descent
New Zealand sportspeople of Tongan descent
Track & Field News Athlete of the Year winners
Diamond League winners
World Athletics Indoor Championships winners
IAAF Continental Cup winners
World Athletics Championships winners
IAAF World Athletics Final winners
Members of the Order of Queen Sālote Tupou III
Medallists at the 2002 Commonwealth Games
Medallists at the 2010 Commonwealth Games
Medallists at the 2014 Commonwealth Games
Medallists at the 2018 Commonwealth Games